Chionanthus crassifolius is a species of flowering plants in the family Oleaceae. It is found in Brazil.

References

External links 
 Chionanthus crassifolius at the Plant List

crassifolius
Flora of Brazil
Plants described in 1994